Anxi railway station is a railway station in Anxi County, Quanzhou, Fujian, China. It is on the Zhangping–Quanzhou–Xiaocuo railway.

History
The station opened in 1998. The final passenger service was withdrawn after 9 December 2014. The station has subsequently been used for freight.

See also
Anxi West railway station

References 

Railway stations in Fujian
Railway stations in China opened in 1998